Twenty Years and Change is the eighth studio album, released in 2005, by country music artist Collin Raye. His first studio album in 3 years, it produced the singles "I Know That's Right" and "Hurricane Jane", neither of which charted.

Three of the album's tracks are cover songs: "Let Your Love Flow" was previously recorded by The Bellamy Brothers; "The Search Is Over" by Survivor; and "It's Only Make Believe" was originally recorded by Conway Twitty. In addition, "Josephine" was later recorded by Joey + Rory and released as a single from their album His and Hers.

Track listing

Personnel
As listed in liner notes.
Eddie Bayers – drums, percussion
Larry Beaird – acoustic guitar
Mike Chapman – bass guitar
J. T. Corenflos – electric guitar
Glen Duncan – fiddle, mandolin
Paul Franklin – steel guitar
Johnny Garcia – electric guitar
John Gardner – drums, percussion
Sonny Garrish – steel guitar
Aubrey Haynie – fiddle
Rick Jackson – piano, organ, keyboards
Tim Lauer – accordion
Paul Leim – drums, percussion
Gene LeSage – piano, organ, keyboards, background vocals
Fred Mollin – acoustic guitar
Steve Nathan – piano, organ, keyboards
Johnny Neel – piano, organ, keyboards
Larry Paxton – bass guitar
Collin Raye – lead vocals, background vocals
Michael Rojas – piano, organ, keyboards
Paul Scholten – drums, percussion
Steve Shehan – acoustic guitar
C. Michael Spriggs – acoustic guitar
John Willis – electric guitar, banjo

Chart performance

2005 albums
Collin Raye albums